
The  was an annual professional wrestling tag team tournament, founded by All Japan Women's Pro-Wrestling (AJW), which held it from 1985 to 2004 (with no tournament taking place in 1990). After the folding of AJW in 2005, the tournament was adopted by its one-time rival and later associate promotion, JWP Joshi Puroresu, which held it annually from 2011 to 2016.

The tournament is usually held under round-robin rules with only the 2004 and 2016 tournaments having been held in a single-elimination format. The tournament's points system has varied throughout the years. From 1985 to 1992, a win was worth one point, a draw half a point and a loss zero points. From 1993 onwards a win has been worth two points, a draw one point and a loss zero points. When JWP took over promoting the tournament in 2011, it was moved to the beginning of the year from its usual position at the end of the year. JWP was also the first to introduce two round-robin blocks in the tournament instead of the usual single block system used by AJW. In AJW, the winners usually received a shot at the WWWA World Tag Team Championship, were they not already the reigning champions, while in JWP the tournament was used to determine the number one contenders to the unified Daily Sports Women's and JWP Tag Team Championships.

Due to the tournament's unusual name, it has sometimes been referred to as "The Best Tag (Team) League" by English language reporters, however, the tournament's Japanese promoters have always called it "Tag League the Best".

Manami Toyota holds the record for most Tag League the Best wins with five, all with different partners. No tag team has been able to win the tournament twice. Madusa Miceli is the only non-Japanese wrestler to be part of a winning team in the tournament.

List of winners

1985
The first Tag League the Best was held in late 1985, with the finals taking place on October 10. The tournament featured eight teams in a single block, facing each other in a round-robin tournament. After the round-robin section was finished, the top team qualified straight to the final match, while teams placed second and third were put in a semifinal match to determine the other finalist.

1986
The second Tag League the Best was held at the end of 1986, with the finals taking place on October 10, 1986. This year, the two top teams following the round-robin portion advanced directly to the finals of the tournament, with no semifinal matches taking place.

1987
The third Tag League the Best culminated in a final match on October 11, 1987. For the second year in a row, there were no semifinal matches; the two top teams following the round-robin portion took part in a final match.

1988
The fourth Tag League the Best ran in late 1988 and culminated in a final match on October 10. The top team following the round-robin portion of the tournament moved directly to the finals, while teams number two and three faced off in a semifinal match.

1989
The fifth Tag League the Best was held in late 1989 and culminated in a final match on October 8. This tournament was the first two introduce two semifinal matches, with the top four teams qualifying following the round-robin portion.

1991
After no tournament was held in 1990, Tag League the Best returned in 1991 taking place between October 4 and December 8.

1992
The seventh Tag League the Best was held between October 17 and December 13, 1992. This was the final tournament to feature half points. The two top teams following the round-robin portion qualified directly to the semifinals.

1993
The eighth Tag League the Best was held between October 10 and December 10, with a final match taking place between the two top teams.

1994
The ninth Tag League the Best was held between October 8 and December 10, 1994. Due to a three-way tie following the round-robin portion of the tournament, the top three teams faced each other once more to determine the winner. Manami Toyota and Takako Inoue prevailed, defeating both Aja Kong and Reggie Bennett, and Kyoko Inoue and Sakie Hasegawa, while Kong and Bennett were able to win only one of the tiebreaker matches and Inoue and Hasegawa lost both.

1995
The tenth Tag League the Best ran between October 10 and December 10, 1995, and was the first and thus far only tournament to feature a match for the third place in the tournament.

1996
The eleventh Tag League the Best was held between October 13 and December 1, 1996. For the first time in five years, the tournament featured semifinal matches, with the top four teams qualifying for advancement following the round-robin portion.

1997
The twelfth Tag League the Best took place in late 1997 and culminated in a final match on December 21. No semifinal matches took place.

1998
The thirteenth Tag League the Best took place between October 10 and November 22, 1998, again with no semifinal matches.

1999
The fourteenth Tag League the Best was held between October 10 and December 26, 1999. For the first time in eight years, the tournament featured a single semifinal match between teams ranked two and three following the round-robin portion, while the top team qualified directly to the finals.

2000
The fifteenth Tag League the Best was held between October 15 and December 23, 2000. The winners of the tournament, Etsuko Mita and Mima Shimoda, went on to defeat Momoe Nakanishi and Nanae Takahashi for the WWWA World Tag Team Championship on January 4, 2001.

2001
The sixteenth Tag League the Best was held between September 23 and December 2, 2001.

2002
The seventeenth Tag League the Best was held between October 15 and December 23, 2002, and saw the return of the two semifinal match format. While the tournament was ongoing, Etsuko Mita and Mima Shimoda defeated Momoe Nakanishi and Nanae Takahashi in a non-tournament match to win the WWWA World Tag Team Championship, however, their failure to win the tournament resulted in them relinquishing the title.

2003
The eighteenth Tag League the Best was held between November 2 and December 23, 2003, again with two semifinal matches between the top four teams. The winners of the tournament, Ayako Hamada and Nanae Takahashi, went on to defeat Kyoko Inoue and Takako Inoue for the WWWA World Tag Team Championship on January 3, 2004.

2004
The 2004 version of the Tag League the Best, the final one held by AJW, was also the first tournament contested in a single-elimination format between December 4 and 26.

2011
Following the folding of AJW in 2005, Tag League the Best was dead for six years, before being picked up by JWP, which held its first tournament, overall the twentieth, between January 16 and March 6, 2011. The tournament featured eight teams split between two blocks, dubbed "Blue Zone" and "Red Zone". Due to a three-way tie at the top of the Blue Zone, February 20 saw two matches taking place between the three teams to determine who would get to face the winner of the Red Zone in the finals. During the opening day of the tournament, Kayoko Haruyama and Tsubasa Kuragaki put their Daily Sports Women's Tag Team Championship on the line in their match against Hailey Hatred and Kaori Yoneyama. Haruyama and Kuragaki entered the tournament as not only the Daily Sports Women's Tag Team Champions, but also as the JWP Tag Team Champions, and as they were able to win the tournament it did not result in any direct title matches.

2012
The twenty-first Tag League the Best was held between January 9 and April 8, 2012, and was contested for the Daily Sports Women's and JWP Tag Team Championships, which were taken off Hailey Hatred and Kaori Yoneyama on January 9 as punishment for Yoneyama going back on her claim to retire at the end of 2011. Moon Mizuki was injured mid-tournament; as a result, she and her partner Manami Katsu were forced to forfeit their last two matches.

2013
The twenty-second Tag League the Best took place between February 17 and April 7, 2013, and was used to determine the number one contenders to the Daily Sports Women's and JWP Tag Team Championships, held by Kayoko Haruyama and Tsubasa Kuragaki.

2014
The twenty-third Tag League the Best took place between January 5 and March 16, 2014. Kayoko Haruyama and Manami Katsu originally won block B, but were forced to pull out of the final match after Katsu injured her left ankle while training, giving the spot in the finals to Leon and Ray, who had finished second in the block. The winners of the tournament were scheduled to challenge Dash Chisako and Sendai Sachiko for the Daily Sports Women's and JWP Tag Team Championships on April 20, but the match was canceled due to Sachiko suffering a knee injury.

2015
The twenty-fourth Tag League the Best took place between January 18 and March 22, 2015. Defending tournament winners Rabbit Miu and Tsukushi were forced to forfeit their opening match in the tournament on February 15, due to Miu being sidelined with dizziness. That same day, Hanako Nakamori suffered a knee injury, forcing her and Arisa Nakajima to forfeit their two remaining matches in the tournament.

2016
The 2016 version of the Tag League the Best was the second contested in a single-elimination format. Taking place between January 31 and February 21, the tournament was used to determine the number one contenders to the Daily Sports Women's and JWP Tag Team Championships, held by Best Friends (Arisa Nakajima and Tsukasa Fujimoto).

See also
All Japan Women's Pro-Wrestling
JWP Joshi Puroresu
Japan Grand Prix
G1 Tag League
World's Strongest Tag Determination League

References

External links
JWP Joshi Puroresu's official website 
Tag League the Best results at Purolove.com 
1980s Tag League the Best results at ProWrestlingHistory.com
1990s Tag League the Best results at ProWrestlingHistory.com
2000s Tag League the Best results at ProWrestlingHistory.com

All Japan Women's Pro-Wrestling
JWP Joshi Puroresu
Women's professional wrestling tournaments
Tag team tournaments